Gracillaria is a genus of moths in the family Gracillariidae.

Species
Gracillaria albicapitata Issiki, 1930
Gracillaria arsenievi (Ermolaev, 1977)
Gracillaria chalcanthes (Meyrick, 1894)
Gracillaria japonica Kumata, 1982
Gracillaria loriolella Frey, 1881
Gracillaria syringella (Fabricius, 1794)
Gracillaria toubkalella De Prins, 1985
Gracillaria ussuriella (Ermolaev, 1977)
Gracillaria verina Clarke, 1971

External links
Global Taxonomic Database of Gracillariidae (Lepidoptera) 
 
 

Gracillariinae
Gracillarioidea genera